The 2015 Women's Junior African Volleyball Championship was held in Egypt from  27 February – 1 March 2015.

Round-Robin

Pool

|}

|}

Final standing

Individual awards

Most Valuable Player

Best Spiker

Best Blocker

Best Server

Best Setter

Best Receiver

Best Libero

External links
CAVB official website

Women's African Volleyball Championship
Africa
2015 in Egyptian sport
International volleyball competitions hosted by Egypt